Potamididae, common name potamidids (also known as horn snails or mudwhelks) are a family of small to large brackish water snails that live on mud flats, mangroves and similar habitats. They are amphibious gastropod molluscs in the superfamily Cerithioidea.

Traditionally, potamidids and batillariids have been confused because they have similar shells and they live in similar environments. For many fossil taxa the family assignment to either of these two families is still unresolved or controversial.

According to the taxonomy of the Gastropoda by Bouchet & Rocroi (2005) the family Potamididae has no subfamilies.

Distribution 
The distribution of Potamididae includes the Indo-West Pacific, the eastern Pacific and the Atlantic Ocean.

Genera
Six living and a number of fossil genera are currently recognized:

Recent genera:
 Cerithidea Swainson, 1840
 Cerithideopsis Thiele, 1929
 possible subgenus or synonym: † Harrisianella Olson, 1929 - Reid et al. (2008) classify Harrisianella as a possible subgenus or synonym of Cerithideopsis
 possible subgenus or synonym: † Lagunitis Olsson, 1929 - Reid et al. (2008) classify Lagunitis as a possible subgenus or synonym of Cerithideopsis
 Cerithideopsilla Thiele, 1929 - synonym: Pirenella Gray, 1847 (or of Potamides)
 Telescopium Montfort, 1810
 Terebralia  Swainson, 1840
 possible subgenus or synonym: † Gravesicerithium Charpiat, 1923
 subgenus or synonym: † Cerithideops Pilsbry & Harbison, 1933
 Tympanotonos Schumacher, 1817

Fossil genera (fossils are difficult to differentiate from other cerithioideans, such as the Batillariidae):
 † Bittiscala Finlay & Marwick, 1937
 † Campanilopsis Chavan, 1949
 † Canaliscala Cossmann, 1888
 † Echinobathra Cossmann, 1906
 † Exechestoma Cossmann, 1899
 † Gantechinobathra Kowalke, 2001
 † Hadraxon Oppenheim, 1892
 † Potamides Brongniart, 1810 - type genus, its type species is extinct and the whole genus is extinct, synonym: Pirenella Gray, 1847
 subgenus or synonym: † Ptychopotamides Saccho, 1895
 subgenus or synonym: † Mesohalina Wittibschlager, 1983
 subgenus or synonym: † Vicarya d'Archiac & Haimes, 1854
 subgenus or synonym: † Vicaryella Yabe & Hatai, 1938
 possible subgenus or synonym: † Eotympanotonus Chavan, 1952
 † Potamidopsis Munier-Chalmas, 1900
 † Terebraliopsis Cossmann, 1906

Generic names brought into synonymy
 Aphanistylus P. Fischer, 1884: synonym of Cerithidea Swainson, 1840
 Phaenommia Mörch, 1860: synonym of Cerithidea Swainson, 1840
 Pirenella Gray, 1847 is a synonym of Potamides Brongniart, 1810 or of Cerithideopsilla
 Tympanotomus Gray, 1840: synonym of Tympanotonos Schumacher, 1817
 Tympanotonus Agassiz, 1846: synonym of Tympanotonos Schumacher, 1817

Ecology
Most of the 29 living species of Potamididae show a close association with mangroves. Most species live on mudflats, but some also climb mangrove trees.

References

External links 

 
Gastropod families
Taxa named by Arthur Adams (zoologist)
Taxa named by Henry Adams (zoologist)